Gilda is a 1946 American film noir directed by Charles Vidor and starring Rita Hayworth and Glenn Ford. The film is known for cinematographer Rudolph Maté's lush photography, costume designer Jean Louis's wardrobe for Hayworth (particularly for the dance numbers), and choreographer Jack Cole's staging of "Put the Blame on Mame" and "Amado Mio", sung by Anita Ellis. Over the years Gilda has gained cult classic status. In 2013, the film was selected for preservation in the United States National Film Registry by the Library of Congress as being "culturally, historically or aesthetically significant".

Plot
Johnny Farrell, an American newly arrived in Buenos Aires, Argentina, wins a lot of money cheating at craps. He is rescued from a robbery attempt by a complete stranger, Ballin Mundson. Mundson tells him about an illegal high-class casino, but warns him not to cheat there. Farrell ignores his advice, wins at blackjack, and is taken to see the casino's owner, who turns out to be Mundson. Farrell talks Mundson into hiring him and soon becomes Mundson's trusted casino manager.

Mundson returns from a trip and announces he has a new wife, Gilda, whom he has married after only knowing her for a day. Johnny and Gilda instantly recognize each other, though both deny it when Mundson questions them. Mundson assigns Farrell to watch over Gilda. Johnny and Gilda are consumed with hatred for each other, and she cavorts with men at all hours in increasingly more blatant efforts to enrage Johnny, and in return he grows more spiteful towards her.

Mundson is visited by two German mobsters. Their organization financed a tungsten cartel, with everything put in Mundson's name in order to hide their connection to it. They have decided that it is safe to take over the cartel now that World War II has ended, but Mundson refuses to transfer ownership. The Argentinian police are suspicious of the Germans and assign agent Obregon to try to obtain information from Farrell, but he knows nothing about this aspect of Mundson's operations. The Germans return to the casino during a carnival celebration, and Mundson ends up killing one of them.

Farrell rushes to take Gilda to safety. Alone in Mundson's house, they have another confrontation and after declaring their undying hatred for each other, passionately kiss. After hearing the front door slam, they realize Mundson has overheard and a guilt-ridden Farrell pursues him to a waiting private airplane. The plane explodes in midair and plummets into the ocean.  Mundson parachutes to safety.  Farrell, unaware of this, concludes that Mundson has committed suicide.

Gilda inherits his estate. Farrell and she immediately marry, but unknown to her, Johnny is marrying her to punish her for her betrayal of Mundson. He abandons her, but has her followed day and night by his men to torment her. Gilda tries to escape the tortured marriage a number of times, but Farrell thwarts every attempt.

Obregon confiscates the casino and informs Farrell that Gilda was never truly unfaithful to Mundson or to him, prompting Farrell to try to reconcile with her. At that moment, Mundson reappears, revealing he faked his suicide. He tries to kill both Gilda and Farrell, but bartender Uncle Pio fatally stabs him. When Obregon arrives, Johnny tries to take the blame for the murder, but Obregon points out that Mundson was already declared legally dead and declines to arrest him.  Farrell gives Obregon incriminating documents from Mundson's safe.  Farrell and Gilda reconcile.

Cast

Cast notes
 Anita Ellis dubbed the singing voice of Rita Hayworth in all songs.

Production
Gilda was filmed from September 4 to December 10, 1945.

Hayworth's introductory scene was shot twice. While the action of her popping her head into the frame and the subsequent dialogue remains the same, she is dressed in different costumes—in a striped blouse and dark skirt in one film print, and the more famous off-the-shoulder dressing gown in the other.

Reception
When first released, Variety liked the film and wrote, "Hayworth is photographed most beguilingly. The producers have created nothing subtle in the projection of her s.a. [sex appeal], and that's probably been wise. Glenn Ford is the vis-a-vis, in his first picture part in several years ... Gilda is obviously an expensive production—and shows it. The direction is static, but that's more the fault of the writers."

Gilda screened in competition at the 1946 Cannes Film Festival, the first time the festival was held.

More recently, Emanuel Levy wrote a positive review: "Featuring Rita Hayworth in her best-known performance, Gilda, released just after the end of WWII, draws much of its peculiar power from its mixture of genres and the way its characters interact with each other ... Gilda was a cross between a hardcore noir adventure of the 1940s and the cycle of 'women's pictures.' Imbued with a modern perspective, the film is quite remarkable in the way it deals with sexual issues." The A.V. Club said "Part of Gilda‘s fascination is the way that it complicates the idea of the femme fatale. (...) Hayworth plays Gilda with a layer of bravado that masks deep insecurity" but mentioned that the unusual happy ending for a noir almost ruined the film experience.

The review aggregator Rotten Tomatoes reported that 90% of critics gave the film a positive review, based on 67 reviews.

The film earned theatrical rentals of $3,750,000 in the United States and Canada and $6 million worldwide.

Operation Crossroads nuclear test

While Gilda was in release, it was widely reported that an atomic bomb to be tested at Bikini Atoll in the Pacific Ocean's Marshall Islands would bear an image of Hayworth, a reference to her bombshell status. The fourth atomic bomb ever to be detonated was decorated with a photograph of Hayworth cut from the June 1946 issue of Esquire magazine. Above it was stenciled the device's nickname, "Gilda", in two-inch black letters. Although the gesture was meant as a compliment, Hayworth was deeply offended.

Memorabilia

The two-piece costume worn by Hayworth in the "Amado Mio" nightclub sequence was offered as part of the "TCM Presents ... There's No Place Like Hollywood" auction November 24, 2014, at Bonhams in New York. It was estimated that the costume would fetch between $40,000 and $60,000; in the event it sold for $161,000.

Home media
In January 2016 The Criterion Collection released DVD and Blu-ray Disc versions of Gilda, featuring a new 2K digital film restoration, with uncompressed monaural soundtrack on the Blu-ray version.

Notes

References

External links

 Gilda—essay by Kimberly Truhler on the National Film Registry website
 
 
 Gilda at aenigma
 
 
 
 Photos of Rita Hayworth in Gilda by Ned Scott
 "The Long Shadow of Gilda—An essay by Sheila O’Malley at the Criterion Collection

1946 films
1946 romantic drama films
American black-and-white films
American romantic drama films
Columbia Pictures films
1940s English-language films
Female characters in film
Film noir
Films directed by Charles Vidor
Films set in Buenos Aires
Films shot in Los Angeles
Films about gambling
United States National Film Registry films
1940s American films